Garde Basil Gardom,  (July 17, 1924 – June 18, 2013) was a Canadian politician, lawyer, and the 26th Lieutenant Governor of British Columbia.

Early life
Gardom was born in Banff, Alberta on July 17, 1924. He grew up in the Fraser Valley of British Columbia, and attended secondary school in Vancouver. He obtained his BA and LLB degrees from the University of British Columbia. During his undergraduate years, he played varsity basketball for the Thunderbirds and was an active member of the BC Alpha Chapter of the Phi Delta Theta fraternity.  He then practised law in Vancouver.

Political career
Gardom was elected to the Legislative Assembly of British Columbia in the constituency of Vancouver-Point Grey in the general elections of 1966, 1969, 1972, 1975, 1979, and 1983. Originally a Liberal, he joined the Social Credit party in 1974 and was appointed to the cabinet of Premier Bill Bennett in 1975. He held numerous ministerial positions including Attorney General, Minister of Intergovernmental Relations, and was the longest-serving Government House Leader.

In 1987, Gardom was appointed the agent-general for British Columbia in London, England. He served in that post until 1992.

Lieutenant Governor
In 1995, Gardom was appointed Lieutenant Governor of British Columbia by Governor General Roméo LeBlanc, on the advice of Prime Minister Jean Chrétien. He was the only non-Liberal politician to be appointed as a Lieutenant Governor during Chrétien's term (although Gardom started out his career with the Liberals). He served until 2001. In 2002 he received the Order of British Columbia.

Personal life
In 1956, Gardom married Helen Eileen Mackenzie. They had five children.
Gardom was a very active contributor to the 4-H community.

Death
Gardom died on June 18, 2013, aged 88.

Arms

References

External links
Garde Gardom on B.C. Government House website

1924 births
2013 deaths
Attorneys General of British Columbia
British Columbia Liberal Party MLAs
British Columbia Social Credit Party MLAs
Canadian King's Counsel
Canadian people of Scottish descent
Canadian sportsperson-politicians
Lawyers in British Columbia
Lieutenant Governors of British Columbia
Members of the Executive Council of British Columbia
Members of the Order of British Columbia
People from Banff, Alberta
Peter A. Allard School of Law alumni
Politicians from Vancouver
Sportspeople from Vancouver
UBC Thunderbirds basketball players
University of British Columbia alumni